Gene Jones is an American character actor, who appeared in No Country for Old Men (2007) and The Sacrament (2013), with the latter earning him a nomination for a Fangoria Chainsaw Award as Best Supporting Actor.

Filmography

References

External links
 

21st-century American male actors
Living people
Year of birth missing (living people)
American male film actors
American male television actors
Place of birth missing (living people)